Lanyon High School is a secondary school located in Conder, Australian Capital Territory. It serves the Lanyon Valley and surrounding rural areas in the Tuggeranong district of Canberra, Australia. The school was established in 1996 by the ACT department of education to address the needs of young people in years 7–10 as they move from primary school to further education, training or employment.

History 
There is a lot of history in the school walls, such as the Canberran singing legend himself, Timomatic. The school has had many visits from famous names of the world, and has been interviewed by WIN News.

School structure 

The school is split into four sub schools:
Green – English/SOSE/LOTE
Gold – Maths/Science/PE
Red – The Arts and Technology
Blue – Student Services

Buildings 

Lanyon's main building is two stories high. The top level is Green (English/SOSE/LOTE) and the bottom is split into two areas, Red (The Arts and Technology) and Gold (Maths/Science/PE). The school has four computer labs plus a library. There are six science labs, as well as a separate dance and drama room. The majority of rooms are equipped with smartboards.

School houses 

Students participate in the Athletics carnival, Swimming Carnival and the Cross country in their school houses. Students are placed into school houses according to their surname.
Bond (Red) A–F (named after Australian Paralympic wheelchair Rugby Player Chris Bond)
Buchanan (Yellow) G-O (named after Olympian Caroline Buchanan who is an Australian cyclist in BMX and mountain biking) 
Mills(Green) P–Z (named after Olympian Patrick Mills who is an Indigenous Australian professional basketball player)

Enrolment 

Lanyon High School enrolls students in Year 7 from a number of feeder primary schools, including Gordon, Conder and Bonython primary schools. For year 8–10 enrolments are accepted for students living in the area according to vacant spaces available at the school.

Lanyon Cluster 

The Lanyon Cluster schools are:
 Bonython Primary School
 Gordon Primary School
 Charles Conder Primary School

See also 
 List of schools in the Australian Capital Territory

References

External links 
 Lanyon High School website
 Dorothea Mackellar Poetry Awards 2010
 Landcare Awards 2009
 2008 Japan Trip
 Principal for a day
 Drawing the lines: schools political cartooning competition – winning entries

Public schools in the Australian Capital Territory
High schools in the Australian Capital Territory
Educational institutions established in 1996
Rock Eisteddfod Challenge participants
1996 establishments in Australia